Pedda Bommalapuram is a village in Prakasam district of the India state of Andhra Pradesh. It is located in Dornala mandal.

References 

Villages in Prakasam district